Stinson Beach is an unincorporated community and census-designated place (CDP) in Marin County, California, on the west coast of the United States. The population of the Stinson Beach CDP was 541 at the 2020 census.

Stinson Beach is about a 35-minute drive from the Golden Gate Bridge on California's Highway 1. It is near important attractions such as Muir Woods National Monument, Muir Beach, and Mount Tamalpais.  It has a long beach, and the cold water produces fog throughout the year.

Stinson Beach is a popular day trip for people in the San Francisco Bay Area and for tourists visiting Northern California. Although most visitors arrive by private car, Stinson Beach is linked to Marin City by a daily bus service, and the network of hiking trails around Mount Tamalpais also reaches the town. The beach is one of the cleanest in the state, and sandy, unlike the rockier neighboring beach in Bolinas.

History
Nathan H. Stinson bought land at the site in 1866.

In 1870, the first road was built along the Pacific coast from Sausalito, and a tent settlement sprang up amongst the willow trees at the beach, which gave rise to the town's original name, Willow Camp. The Mt. Tamalpais & Muir Woods Railway opened in 1896, making Willow Camp more accessible. Visitors could ride the train to West Point Inn and then hike or arrange a stagecoach to take them to the beach. In 1906, refugees from the San Francisco earthquake came to the area and built some of the area's first businesses. Stinson Beach became the official town name in 1916, in honor of the largest landowners, Rose and Nathan Stinson.

The first post office opened in 1916.

In 1939, the beach was sold to Marin County.  It was transferred to the state of California in 1950, and was eventually transferred to the National Park Service in 1977.

In 2002, a surfer was attacked by a  great white shark while surfing off Stinson Beach. The young man survived, but received more than 100 stitches to close his wounds. The attack was the second in Stinson Beach, and the 13th in Marin County since 1952. In 1998, Jonathan Kathrein was attacked by a great white shark while bodyboarding. His injury from the shark bite required over 600 stitches. The surf off Stinson Beach is within an area known as the Red Triangle, where there have been an unusually high number of shark attacks.

Marin County added 12 tsunami warning signs to the Stinson Beach shoreline in 2012 to explain the risk to beachgoers.

Geography

Climate
According to the Köppen Climate Classification system, Stinson Beach has a warm-summer Mediterranean climate, abbreviated "Csb" on climate maps. Like much of the California coast, summer afternoons are often cool and windy (and usually foggy) as winds blow in off the cold ocean. Adjacent sea surface temperatures are typically in the low to mid 50s F year-round.

Demographics

2010
The 2010 United States Census reported that Stinson Beach had a population of 632. The racial makeup of Stinson Beach was 582 (92.1%) White, 3 (0.5%) African American, 8 (1.3%) Native American, 14 (2.2%) Asian, 1 (0.2%) Pacific Islander, 9 (1.4%) from other races, and 15 (2.4%) from two or more races. Hispanic or Latino of any race were 33 persons (5.2%).

The Census reported that 629 people (99.5% of the population) lived in households, 3 (0.5%) lived in non-institutionalized group quarters, and 0 (0%) were institutionalized.

There were 339 households, out of which 50 (14.7%) had children under the age of 18 living in them, 134 (39.5%) were opposite-sex married couples living together, 14 (4.1%) had a female householder with no husband present, 10 (2.9%) had a male householder with no wife present.  There were 26 (7.7%) unmarried opposite-sex partnerships, and 8 (2.4%) same-sex married couples or partnerships. 147 households (43.4%) were made up of individuals, and 45 (13.3%) had someone living alone who was 65 years of age or older. The average household size was 1.86.  There were 158 families (46.6% of all households); the average family size was 2.54.

The population was spread out, with 76 people (12.0%) under the age of 18, 26 people (4.1%) aged 18 to 24, 117 people (18.5%) aged 25 to 44, 278 people (44.0%) aged 45 to 64, and 135 people (21.4%) who were 65 years of age or older.  The median age was 54.4 years. For every 100 females, there were 94.5 males.  For every 100 females age 18 and over, there were 95.1 males.

The homeowner vacancy rate was 2.3%; the rental vacancy rate was 9.7%.  425 people (67.2% of the population) lived in owner-occupied housing units and 204 people (32.3%) lived in rental housing units.

2000
As of the census of 2000, there were 751 people, 374 households, and 178 families residing in the CDP. The racial makeup of the CDP in 2010 was 89.6% non-Hispanic White, 0.5% non-Hispanic African American, 0.2% Native American, 2.2% Asian, 0.2% from Pacific Islander, 0.5% from other races, and 1.6% from two or more races. Hispanic or Latino of any race were 5.2% of the population.

There were 374 households, out of which 18.7% had children under the age of 18 living with them, 40.6% were married couples living together, 4.8% had a female householder with no husband present, and 52.4% were non-families. 42.0% of all households were made up of individuals, and 11.0% had someone living alone who was 65 years of age or older.  The average household size was 1.98 and the average family size was 2.75.

In the CDP, the population was spread out, with 16.9% under the age of 18, 3.3% from 18 to 24, 25.8% from 25 to 44, 39.4% from 45 to 64, and 14.5% who were 65 years of age or older.  The median age was 47 years. For every 100 females, there were 98.2 males.  For every 100 females age 18 and over, there were 100.0 males.

The median income for a household in the CDP was $87,679, and the median income for a family was $105,827. Males had a median income of $58,750 versus $56,875 for females. The per capita income for the CDP was $62,452.  About 3.8% of families and 5.1% of the population were below the poverty line, including 11.8% of those under the age of eighteen and 10.4% of those 65 or over.

Education
Stinson Beach is in the Bolinas-Stinson Union School District, the Tamalpais Union High School District, and the Marin Community College District.  Students in primary grades (K-2) attend Stinson Beach School, while elementary grade students (grades 3–8) attend Bolinas School.  Stinson Beach is in the attendance area of Tamalpais High School, in Mill Valley.

Government
Stinson Beach is unincorporated, receiving general government services from Marin County, including law enforcement, land use planning, library, public health, and code enforcement. Three special districts provide local services.  The Stinson Beach County Water District provides water and septic tank maintenance service and contracts for garbage and recycling collection.  The Stinson Beach Volunteer Fire Protection District provides fire protection, emergency medical care, and disaster management services.  The Marin County Flood Control and Water Conservation District administers programs which aim to mitigate flooding, historically concentrating on issues related to the flooding of Easkoot Creek.

Community organizations
The Stinson Beach Village Association was formed in 1976 to represent the town as the County developed the first Stinson Beach Community Plan. The Village Association's current elected president is village resident Michael Matthews.  Previously, development of the town had been promoted by the Stinson Beach Progressive Club, one of several non-profit organizations that formed the board of the Stinson Beach Community Center.  The other founding organizations were the Allied Arts Club, the Stinson Beach Community Church, The Volunteer Fire Department, and the Parent-Teachers Club.  The Community Center complex on Belvedere Avenue includes the Fire House, which fronts on Shoreline Highway, the Community Center, and the Chapel.  The land was donated by the FitzHenrys and the other heirs of the Stinson families.

Regional recreation areas
 Audubon Canyon Ranch
 Golden Gate National Recreation Area
 Mount Tamalpais State Park
 Point Reyes National Seashore

Annual events
On the second Sunday of June, the town serves as the ending point for the annual running of the Dipsea Race, the second-oldest footrace in the U.S. The California Road Club holds its Mount Tamalpais Hill Climb, one of the oldest bicycle races in the West, in early fall.  Since 2002, the race has been held on the third Saturday of the month, with about 400 bicyclists competing in the  road race from Stinson to the head of Bolinas Lagoon and on to the West summit of Mount Tamalpais at Rock Spring.

"Cuisine on the Green" is a yearly event held in the town's central park, the Village Green, each May. It features local restaurants and merchants selling a wide variety of foods, trinkets, clothing, art, and novelty items at different booths. Talent local to the area often performs on the small park stage. Cuisine on the Green benefits the Stinson Beach Community Center.

On July 4 of every year, a "tug-of-war" is held with Bolinas across the inlet dividing the two communities. Thirty women from each shore pull against each other until a winner is declared, and then 30 men from each take their turn. It is a slice of life, pure Americana, and always contested both during the actual event and then afterward in the local bars of Smiley's and the Sand Dollar, where the winners' trophies are displayed.

Notable people

Residents, landowners, and summer people important in the development, life, and culture of Stinson Beach.  Arrival or tenure is shown in square brackets.  Birth and death dates are shown in parentheses.

 Rafael Garcia [1836–1846], first settler on Bolinas Lagoon.
 Gregorio (1791–May 10, 1863) and Ramona Garcia Briones (1793/4–June 23, 1901), received the Rancho Las Baulines Mexican land grant on February 11, 1846; after being widowed, Ramona married Benancio Munos when she was almost 80; when she died at the age of 107, Ramona Garcia Munos was believed to be the oldest woman in California.
 Pablo Briones [1837–?], with his uncle, Rafael Garcia, managed the Rancho for his parents, Gregorio and Ramona; trained as curandero by his aunt, Juana Briones de Miranda; settled in Bolinas.
 Captain Isaac Morgan [c. 1851–?], purchased the portion of Rancho Las Baulines east of Bolinas Lagoon in 1852; on this property, called Belvidere Ranch and which was to become Stinson Beach, he grew apples, cut wood, built boats, and had a dairy farm; in 1866, as lead partner in the Morgan Land Company, purchased the Page Tract, which ran from Belvidere Ranch to Dogtown and which became the Bourne and Wilkins Ranches.
 Nathan and Rose Stinson [1870s–?], established first campground at Willow Camp.
 Captain Alfred Easkoot [1870s–], Marin County surveyor; founder of second campground.; member of Duxbury Grove No. 26, UAOD
 Thaddeus Welch (1844–1919) and Ludmila Pilat Welch (1867–1925) [1896–1905], American painters
 William Kent (March 29, 1864 – March 13, 1928) United States Congressman; donor of the land for the Muir Woods National Monument; owner of the beach and tidelands that became Seadrift.
 Newman Lee Fitzhenry (1881–November 20, 1938) [c. 1913–1938], BS, University of Chicago, 1905; married Eve Stinson and pursued real estate and resort development; suicided November 20, 1938.
 William Kent Jr., began the development of the Seadrift subdivision in the 1950s.
 Mildred Sadler (May 16, 1905 – February 18, 2004) (1926–2004), Principal, Stinson Beach School, 1926–1967.
 Landis Everson (1960s), poet and painter.
 George Hunter White, also known as Colonel White (1965–1975) (died October 23, 1975), Federal Bureau of Narcotics agent and District Supervisor, retired; OSS Counter-Intelligence Director during WWII; led Project MKULTRA in Boston and Operation Midnight Climax in New York and San Francisco brothels (or "safehouses") until the closure of the San Francisco facilities in 1965; Fire Marshall, Stinson Beach Fire Department
 Elmer Collett (1966–present), former professional football player for the 49ers and the Colts
 Peter Bishop Allen (November 1, 1943 – June 3, 2004) (c. 1967–2004), sculptor of marine mammals; Assistant Chief, Stinson Beach Fire Department; founder of The Kids Camp nature education program
 Steve Miller (1960s–1970s), musician
 Jerry Garcia (1970s), musician
 Carolyn Garcia, also known as Mountain Girl (1970s), member of Merry Pranksters, wife of Jerry Garcia
 Keith and Donna Godchaux (1970s), musicians
 Peter Rowan (1970s), musician
 Richard Jencks - former President of CBS.
 The Rowan Brothers – Lorin and Chris Rowan (1970s), musicians
 David Grisman (1970s), musician
 George Frayne (born c. 1946) (c. 1973–199), musician (Commander Cody and His Lost Planet Airmen) and artist; Frayne has referred to Stinson Beach as "formerly the grooviest place on earth."
 Joseph Esherick (1987), famed architect; designed a home on Sea Drift Road 
 James Grant (1924–1997) (c. 1980–1997), painter and sculptor; the art exhibit wall at the Stinson Beach Branch Library is named in his honor
 Jerry Cebe (August 10, 1940 - Sep 1, 2017), artist (abstract painting; art glass)
 Klaus Kinski

In popular culture
Stinson Beach has been the setting and filming location for several movies, including:

 Play It Again, Sam
 The Fog
 Memoirs of an Invisible Man
 The Invisible Man (2020 film); this adaptation is unrelated to the novel & film listed above.
 Basic Instinct
 On The Edge
 Shoot The Moon
  The Crazy-Quilt (1966 John Korty Film)
 America Is Still the Place

The town was mentioned in an episode of M*A*S*H—"The Merchant of Korea".  In the episode, BJ borrows $200 from Charles to wire home to his wife as a down payment on the purchase of a one-acre lot with "trees, the beach, a view of San Francisco...everything!"

George Frayne (Commander Cody) wrote a song about Stinson Beach entitled "Midnight on The Strand". It was recorded on his 1987 album, Let's Rock.

The town and the beach are the topic of a poem by Garrison Keillor. In We Are Still Married: Stories and Letters, Keillor has a four-page essay about his visits to Stinson Beach and how thinking of the beach helps him sleep.

The poet Robert Duncan wrote his influential collection Opening the Field at a house in Stinson Beach.

Janis Joplin's cremated ashes were scattered along this beach as well as the Pacific Ocean.

The story of a young surfer's recovery from a shark attack is the subject of a book, Far from Shore.

Author Danielle Steel writes about Stinson Beach in her novel One Day at a Time (Dell, 2009).

See also

List of beaches in California
List of California state parks

References

Further reading
 Bolinas and Stinson Beach, Arcadia Publishing, August 4, 2004, . Text and images from the photographic collections of the Bolinas Museum and the Stinson Beach Historical Society
 Steve Aikenhead, et al. Group memories: School days in Bolinas and Stinson Beach, Schoolhouse Publications, 1993
 Joan Reutinger, Memories of Willow Camp: A personal history of Stinson Beach, Stinson Beach Village Association, 1993
 Bernard Poinssot, The Stinson Beach Salt Marsh: The Form of Its Growth, Stinson Beach Press, June 1977,

External links
 California Coastal Records Project, "Stinson Beach Central Parking Lot and Restrooms," 2005
 California Coastal Records Project, Stinson Beach - main beach and most of downtown from the air, 2004
 Stinson Beach Community Center
 Stinson Beach Village Association
 Stinson Beach Library
 1977 Oral account of Stinson Beach History from Marin Public Library
 Bolinas Lagoon Foundation

Census-designated places in Marin County, California
Beaches of Marin County, California
Mount Tamalpais
Populated coastal places in California
West Marin
San Francisco Bay Area beaches
Census-designated places in California
Beaches of Northern California